Mieczysław Mickiewicz (1879 – before 1939) was a Ukrainian politician and lawyer of Polish descent, later a statesman of the Second Polish Republic.

Mieczysław Mickiewicz (Polish Democratic Central) served as the Deputy-Secretary of Polish Affairs in several cabinets of the Ukrainian People's Republic, also translated as the Ukrainian National Republic (UNR), headed by Volodymyr Vynnychenko (1917/1918). 
Then he served as voivode of Volhynian Voivodeship, Poland, from February 22, 1922, until February 1, 1923.

References

External links
 National minorities in Ukraine in times of the Ukrainian revolution (Національні меншини України під час Української революції). Radio Svoboda. 2007-09-19
 Komar, V.L. Poles in the post-imperial Russia 1918-21. pdf

1879 births
1939 deaths
People from Kamianets-Podilskyi
People from Kamenets-Podolsky Uyezd
People from the Russian Empire of Polish descent
Ukrainian people of Polish descent
Polish politicians
Ukrainian politicians before 1991
Members of the Central Council of Ukraine
National minority ministers of Ukraine
Voivodes of Volhynian Voivodeship
People who emigrated to escape Bolshevism